Navsarjan Trust is a grassroots Dalit organisation based in Gujarat, India. It was founded in 1989 by Martin Macwan to empower Dalits in Gujarat and beyond. Since November 2004, it is led by Manjula Pradeep who has been working in the organisation since June 1992. Navsarjan Trust has established 'Dalit Shakti Kendra' in Gujarat.Navsarjan’s core work is to create awareness among the marginalised and oppressed communities in such a way that people are able to develop independent thinking about the world around them, so that they can fight oppression and inequality without the organisation’s support.  To this end, the field staff is incessantly involved in mobilising and organizing meetings and training programmes.  Women’s rights groups, land rights groups, youth groups, village paralegals, agricultural workers’ groups, etc. are formed and trained to exist independently of Navsarjan, though Navsarjan’s support remains intact.

Navsarjan is one of the largest grassroots organizations in Gujarat, active in more than 3,000 villages, as well as in major Gujarat cities.  A field staff of about 80 women and men — most of whom come from the communities in which they work — keep Navsarjan in tune with the needs of the people. Our outreach is spread out across India. We are associated with national and international platforms and networks.

Navsarjan works to strengthen the movement for equality, and believes that energy's for all such movements must come from within the oppressed marginalised communities.

In its more than two decades of work, which include setbacks and successes, Navsarjan has grown to be widely recognised locally, state-wide, nationally, and internationally

Notes

External links 
 
 Navsarjan Trust
 http://timesofindia.indiatimes.com/topic/Navsarjan-Trust

Non-profit organisations based in India
1989 establishments in Gujarat
Organizations established in 1989
Organisations based in Gujarat